Gloria Price Kirby, (Nice, France, April 19, 1928 – Tangier, Morocco, 2017) was an American gallerist, art collector and photographer, she founded the Vandrés Gallery in Madrid.

Biography 
Gloria Kirby was the granddaughter of Fred Morgan Kirby, the founder of the F. M. Kirby & Co. 5 & 10-cent Store chain,. and a philanthropist. Kirby's company was a major rival of the much larger F. W. Woolworth & Co. and the two businesses merged in 1912. Fred Kirby then became a Vice President of the F. W. Woolworth & Co., which was listed on the New York Stock Exchange. Gloria Kirby was the daughter of Doris Landy Wayland and Sumner Moore Kirby (1885 -1945) who died in the Buchenwald concentration camp. Summer Moore Kirby married his third wife in 1934, Leonida Georgievna Romanova, Grand Duchess of Russia and mother of Grand Duchess Maria Vladimirovna of Russia, head of the imperial Romanovs. Gloria Kirby married in 1948 Robert St Clair Conahay III (1923-1984), they had three children: Richard Conahay, Cassandra Kirby-Conahay and Robert Conahay IV (1949 - 1979).

Art Collector 
Gloria Kirby began collecting art in 1970 and her collection had more than a thousand works by international artists, including works by Rafael Bartolozzi, Claudio Bravo, Darío Villalba, Guillermo Pérez Villalta, Pablo Runyan, Rafael Cidoncha, José Paredes Jardiel, Armando Pedrosa, Roberto González Fernández, Zush, Daniel Garbade, José Hernández, Juan Muñoz, Luis Gordillo, Juan Giralt, Antoni Mutadas, Joan Hermández Pijuan, Jordy Texidor, Ceseepe, Costus and Miquel Navarro.

She was a friend of the writer and composer Paul Bowles, and established the original Paul Bowles room (in 2010 it was expanded to three rooms, now named the Paul Bowles Wing) with her acquired photographs, furniture and documents dedicated to Bowles at the American Legation, Tangier.

Galerist 
Gloria Kirby lived in France and studied in the United States. In 1965 she moved to Madrid where she met Fernando Vijande. Together they founded the Vandrès Gallery. The careful selection of artists and the boldness to present avant-garde exhibitions during the Franco regime made the Gallery well known. Times where difficult and they were denounced for their exhibition of Erotic art: "Eros and current art in Spain" in 1970, but fortunately they won the case with help personalities of Madrid's Art scene, such as gallery owners Elvira González and Juana Mordó. Franco's censorship closed the collective exhibition "La Paloma" with works in homage to Pablo Picasso in which artist Alfredo Alcaín exhibited a naked doll; the exhibit was reopened a few days later, after the doll was dress up with some panties. In 1980 the Vandrés Gallery was chosen as the main provider for the exhibition at the Solomon R. Guggenheim Museum about Spanish art: New Images From Spain (1980), curated by Margit Rowell. Kirby closed the Gallery in 1980, and  Fernando Vijande reopened a Gallery under his own name in a garage in 1981.

Literature 

 Claudia Arbulú Soto:Los Catalanes de París: un análisis estético, Dykinson,
 Rafael Cervera Torres: Alaska y otras historias de la movida, Random House, Mondadori
 Pablo J. Rico: Veinticinco años de arte en España: creación en libertad, 2003.
 Mariano Navarro:Andalucía y la modernidad: del Equipo 57 a la Generación de los 70, Centro Andaluz de Arte Contemporáneo (Seville, Spain), 2002

References 

1926 births
2017 deaths
American art collectors
Spanish art dealers
Art collections in Spain